Gnostics was a 1987 four-part drama-documentary series made by Border TV for Channel 4 (UK). It was re-broadcast in 1990. The writer of the series, Tobias Churton, also released an accompanying book.

 Episode 1. "Knowledge of the Heart"
 Episode 2. "The Goodmen's Heresy"
 Episode 3. "The Divinity of Man"
 Episode 4. "A Crack in the Universe"

The body of the programmes was compiled of documentary material on Gnostic movements and the Cathars. Among those interviewed were academics and writers Hans Jonas, Gilles Quispel, Elaine Pagels and James Robinson, as well as Muhammad Ali al-Samman who unearthed the texts at Nag Hammadi.

Dramatised sections were acted by Nigel Harrison (as the Gnostic Christ) with other actors including Brian Blessed, Marius Goring and Ian Brooker.

References

1987 British television series debuts
1987 British television series endings
1980s British documentary television series
Channel 4 documentary series
British documentary television series
Television series by ITV Studios
Television shows produced by Border Television
English-language television shows